Prosperity Blues is a 1932 short cartoon distributed by Columbia Pictures, part of the Krazy Kat films.

Plot
The film is set during the Great Depression. Krazy Kat is pulling a box filled with apples, and is trying to sell them. Unfortunately, most people around are low in cash and are too depressed to eat anything because of bad economic times. Moments later, he finds a customer in a spiffy horse. The spiffy horse pays Krazy a check with a considerable amount. Delighted by this, Krazy tries to deposit it in the bank. After getting into a tussle with individuals trying to snatch it, Krazy finds himself chasing his check as it is getting blown away.

After an airborne trip, the check finds its way back into the pockets of the spiffy horse. The spiffy horse then advises Krazy to be happy before putting a smiling mouth on the feline's frowning face. As a result, Krazy is happy and that he pretty much forgotten his problems. Krazy continues the spiffy horse's work in putting smiling mouths on others, thus inverting their moods. Over time, the public's depression is gone and somehow their financial problems also follow.

Krazy, the spiffy horse, and a hare go on to parade across the country, promoting their encouragements to be happy. Eventually, Krazy is seen walking up the steps of some capitol where he is greeted by Uncle Sam.

Notes
The songs Smile, Darn Ya, Smile! and Happy Days Are Here Again are used in the film.
The short is available in the Columbia Cartoon Collection: Volume 3.

See also
 Krazy Kat filmography

References

External links
Prosperity Blues at the Big Cartoon Database
 

1932 films
1932 animated films
American animated short films
American black-and-white films
Krazy Kat shorts
Great Depression films
1930s American animated films
Columbia Pictures short films
Columbia Pictures animated short films
Screen Gems short films